Ernesto Alais (26 October 1929 – 3 February 2016) was an Argentine sports shooter. He competed in the men's 50 metre free pistol event at the 1984 Summer Olympics.

References

External links

1929 births
2016 deaths
Argentine male sport shooters
Olympic shooters of Argentina
Shooters at the 1984 Summer Olympics
Place of birth missing